Stefan Passantino (born August 12, 1966) is an American lawyer and former ethics attorney 
who served in President Trump's Office of White House Counsel.  He is best known for his involvement in the  Jan 6 Capitol attack  House investigation.

Legal and public service career
Passantino graduated from Emory University School of Law in 1991, and clerked for U.S. District Judge Herbert Murray.  Prior to joining the Trump administration, he was head of McKenna Long & Aldridge’s political law team until it merged with Dentons in 2015, where he was the head of the political division; he advised clients on issues including campaign contribution rules and disclosure guidelines. He is a well known ethics expert. Chambers USA 2010 called him one of the leading political lawyers in U.S. He is a co-author of Handbook on Corporate Political Activity, a "regular contributor" for many media outlets, including CNN, Fox News and Politico, and a visiting professor at the University of Georgia. Passantino joined the Trump administration in January 2017, serving as deputy counsel to the president, working on compliance and ethics, policing conflicts of interest and approving and enforcing ethics requirements. His nomination had the strong support of Howard Dean, former Democratic presidential candidate, who opined that Passantino would be clear about ethical boundaries. Newt Gingrich, also, backed him, stating he would “stand firm for an administration that is above reproach.”  The major conflict of interest case that came up  during his tenure was Kellyanne Conway's endorsement of Ivanka Trump's clothing line. Passantino ruled that this was an inadvertent error and there was no disciplinary action. 

He left the administration in August 2018,  joining Michael Best, where he was a partner and led the firm’s political law group. On December 21, 2022, he took a leave of absence from the firm. On December 28, 2022, Michael Best said in a statement that the firm separated their relationship with Passantino.

Political activities

He was "national counsel" on Newt Gingrich's 2012 presidential campaign and for former House Speaker Dennis Hastert. He also served as Johnny Isakson and Roy Blunt's chief election counsel.

In 2019 he founded Elections LLC to advise President Trump's 2020 campaign and other Republican candidates. Elections received about $2 million from Trump associated PACs. In October 2020, just before the last debate, Passantino met with a Wall Street Journal reporter, providing information linking Hunter Biden to his father, regarding Hunter's Chinese dealings. After due diligence, the story was limited to a stub, and noted that there was no proof of the central claim that Joe Biden had profited from his son's dealings. In 2020 he co-chaired Lawyers for Trump, a national organization of lawyers formed to mobilize support for Trump’s reelection campaign. After the 2020 presidential election Passantino sued in court to overturn the results in Georgia, On November 22, 2022, a federal subpoena was served on election officials in several states seeking their records for all communications with Passantino. 

He was the lawyer for Cassidy Hutchinson, a former White House aide, who testified before the  House committee investigating the  Jan 6 attack. She testified that White House officials anticipated violence days in advance of January 6, that Trump knew supporters at the Ellipse rally were armed with weapons including AR-15s yet asked to relax security checks at his speech, and that Trump planned to join the crowd at the Capitol and became irate when the Secret Service refused his request. She has reported that she was encouraged to claim "I do not recall" for events she remembered which might make the president look bad. Hutchinson's testified that Passantino assured her that "Trump world" would find her a job and keep her in the family. On December 20, 2022, CNN identified Passantino as the lawyer who urged a key witness to mislead the committee. On December 22, 2022, the committee released the transcript of Hutchinson's interview, describing her interactions with Passantino.  Days before her testimony, she dismissed Passantino, replacing him with Jody Hunt. Passantino has denied urging her to mislead the panel. The Committee has urged the
DOJ to examine the facts of this case to see whether prosecution is warranted. In March 2023, several dozen prominent legal figures filed a complaint seeking to have his law license revoked on allegations of subornation of perjury, obstruction of justice, witness tampering and bribery.

References

People from Georgia (U.S. state)
Trump administration personnel
American lawyers
Emory University School of Law alumni
Georgia (U.S. state) Republicans
1966 births
Living people